The 23rd Annual American Music Awards were held on January 29, 1996, at the Shrine Auditorium, in Los Angeles, California. The awards recognized the most popular artists and albums from the year 1995.

The ceremony was remembered by country singer-songwriter Garth Brooks refusing to accept the Favorite Artist of the Year Award.

Performances

Winners and nominees

References
 http://www.rockonthenet.com/archive/1996/amas.htm

1996